Al Makha District is a district of the Taiz Governorate, Yemen. As of 2003, the district had a population of 18,155 inhabitants. The capital lies at Mocha.

Location 
It is located in north-west of Taiz governorate. It is bordered by Maqbanah and Al Khawkhah to the north, Al-Mandab to the south, Mawza and Maqbanah to the east, the red sea to the west.

References

 
Districts of Taiz Governorate